Chen Tze-ming (born 28 September 1952) is a Taiwanese professional golfer who has played on the PGA Tour, the Japan Golf Tour, the Asian Golf Circuit, the Asian Tour and the PGA European Tour.  In the U.S., he is often referred to as T.M. Chen.  His younger brother, Chen Tze-chung, is also a professional golfer who has won tournaments on the Japanese, Asian and American tours.  

For his country, Chen represented Taiwan at the 1974 Eisenhower Trophy, a world amateur team tournament, and then again in 1976, playing with his brother as Tze-ming posted the lowest individual score at +1. Chen also represented Taiwan as a professional in the 1979 World Cup, and in 1985 and 1994 at the Alfred Dunhill Cup tournament, a country-based team golf competition, again playing alongside his brother.

Early life 
Chen was born in Linkou District, Taipei City, in northern Taiwan. His grandfather farmed the land that would become the Linkou International Golf Club and his father worked as a greenskeeper at the club. Picking up golf at a young age, his younger brother Tze-chung then followed Tze-ming and picked up the game in his teens, with the brothers often playing together on tour and together in team competitions for Taiwan over their careers.

Professional career  
Chen gained early notice at the 1978 Malaysian Dunlop Masters, winning by a record 15 strokes, but due to his amateur status, runner-up Simon Owen took home the prize money. Chen turned professional later that same year. As a professional, he won nine tournaments on the Japan Golf Tour, with four of those victories coming in 1992 when he finished third on the end of year money list. His best finish in a major was a tie for 3rd in the 1985 PGA Championship, with a stellar final round 65 (281 overall, 3 strokes behind winner Hubert Green).  Of note, the Chen family dominated the final round as the second highest score belonged to his brother Tze-chung, who shot a 66 and finished tied for 23rd.

Tze-ming also won seven times on the Asia Golf Circuit and topped the tour's Order of Merit in 1985. As a senior, Chen won the 2002 Japan PGA Senior Championship.

Personal life 
Chen and his brother have run and coached in the junior program at the Linkou Golf Club in Taipei City.  He now lives in Tokyo.

Professional wins (21)

Japan Golf Tour wins (9)

*Note: Tournament shortened to 54 holes due to weather.

Japan Golf Tour playoff record (4–0)

Asia Golf Circuit wins (7)
1980 Korean Open
1981 Hong Kong Open, Korean Open
1982 Taiwan Open
1983 Thailand Open
1985 Singapore Open
1987 Thai International Thailand Open

Other wins (3)
this list may be incomplete
1978 Malaysian Dunlop Masters (as an amateur)
1985 Rolex Masters (Singapore)
1987 Rolex Masters (Singapore)

Senior wins (2)
this list may be incomplete
2002 Japan PGA Senior Championship
2003 Castle Hill Open

Results in major championships

CUT = missed the half-way cut (3rd round cut in 1985 Open Championship)
"T" = tied

Team appearances
this list may be incomplete

Amateur
Eisenhower Trophy (representing Taiwan): 1974, 1976 (individual leader, tie)

Professional
Dunhill Cup (representing Taiwan): 1985, 1994
World Cup (representing Taiwan): 1979

References

External links

Profile on 2004 Senior PGA Championship site

Taiwanese male golfers
Japan Golf Tour golfers
Asian Tour golfers
Sportspeople from Taipei
1952 births
Living people